Exclusive ride time (ERT) is a period of time set aside by an amusement park to allow exclusive access to one or more attractions. Sessions are usually scheduled outside of a park's normal operating hours, or the attractions may be closed off to the public during the ERT period. Exclusive ride time is often reserved for private corporate events, celebrity functions, season passholders, special ticketed events, members of the media, or enthusiast groups such American Coaster Enthusiasts.

Disney theme parks branded exclusive ride time in the past as Extra Magic Hours, offered to guests staying on-site in a Walt Disney resort. Guests were given early access to the park or allowed to stay past normal operating hours to visit a limited number of attractions that operated during this period. This feature was retired in January 2021 in US parks and replaced with an option that only allows early entry. It remains operative at Disneyland Paris with the revised name of Extra Magic Time (Moments de Magie en Plus) reflecting that the duration is just one hour nowadays.

References

Amusement parks